HSwMS Sverige was the first Swedish Sverige-class coastal defence ship (Pansarskepp) commissioned during the last year of World War I and serving into the 1950s. Her cost was approximately 12 million kronor in 1912, and the entire sum was raised in public in a nationwide fundraising campaign that gained over 15 million (approximately 650 MKr, in 2005 Kr). The fundraising was done because of the Karl Staaff government's reluctance to spend money on a new battleship.

Background
Sweden was not immune from the naval arms race in the early 20th century. After the dissolving of the union with Norway in 1905, the situation was tense with the Russian Empire in the east, Germany south of the Baltic Sea, and Norway, traditionally being an Anglophile country, to the west. In 1911, battle-ready units from the Royal Navy and the German Imperial navy cruised around in the North Sea. Due to the perilous atmosphere brought about by these tensions, and as the latest Swedish coastal battleship  was a typical pre-dreadnought ship (with 2× 8 inch (203 mm) guns and a maximum speed of ), the need for a new class of ships was pressing. Seaworthiness, armament, armour and speed, all had to be improved according to the multiple new technologies that had arrived with the naval arms race that followed the launch of the British Dreadnought Class. In 1911, the parliament voted (with a small majority) funds for the building of the new vessel, known as the F-boat, after the alternative that was chosen from various options (A, B, C, D, D1, D2, E, E1, E2 and F, varying in size from 4,800 to 7,500 metric tons and with armaments and speed in various arrangements accordingly). When Karl Staaff became prime minister in the Autumn of 1911, the funding was postponed. This caused the "Pansarbåtinsamlingen", a fundraising aiming at the 12 million Kronor the ship was estimated to cost. With the backing of King Gustav V in a little over 3 months 15 million was raised to build the ship. This caused a political crisis, and the fall of the government. The new government accepted the money and let the contract for the ship, which was named Sverige for the people who had paid for it.

After the outbreak of World War I two more ships were ordered which had a slightly changed appearance, the two bearing the names of the King and Queen of Sweden.

Note that while the ship is listed as a battleship in Jane's Fighting Ships, 1938 edition, technically it is a coastal defence ship, a class which was commonly used in Nordic countries. The navies of Finland, Norway, and Denmark made use of similar ships. However, the Swedish Navy used the Sverige-class armored warships as the core of battle groups in the same manner as other navies used battleships.

Captains
1917–1918: Fredrik Riben
1926–1927: Gunnar Bjurner
1940–1940: Alarik Wachtmeister
1940–1941: Erik Anderberg
1945–1946: Henning Hammargren

Notes

Bibliography
 
 

Sverige-class coastal defence ships
Ships built in Gothenburg
1915 ships
1915 establishments in Sweden
Sverige